Pavlovs is a surname. Notable people with the surname include:

Andrejs Pavlovs (born 1979), Latvian football goalkeeper
Arkādijs Pavlovs (1903–1960), Latvian footballer and football manager
Deniss Pavlovs (born 1983), Latvian tennis player
Igors Pavlovs (born 1965), Latvian ice hockey player
Vitālijs Pavlovs (born 1989), Latvian ice hockey player

See also 
Pavlov (disambiguation)
Pavlov's dog (disambiguation)
Pavlov's typology
Pavlov's House, building in Russia